Split Ends may refer to:
 Split ends, the splitting or fraying of hair, also known as trichoptilosis
 Split end, a type of wide receiver in American and Canadian football

TV and film
Split Ends (British TV series), a sitcom produced on ITV
Split Ends (American TV series), a reality show on Style Network
Split Ends (2009), a comedy film directed by Dorothy Lyman

Music
Split Enz, a New Zealand band
Split Ends (album), an album by The Move